This is a list of electoral results for the electoral district of Western Downs in Queensland state elections.

Members for Western Downs

Election results

Elections in the 1990s

References

Queensland state electoral results by district